Vivel del Río Martín is a municipality located in Cuencas Mineras, Teruel Province, Aragon, Spain. According to the 2004 census (INE), the municipality had a population of 84 inhabitants.

See also
 List of municipalities in Teruel

External links
 Town website

References

Municipalities in the Province of Teruel